Leitch Keir (22 June 1861 – 29 June 1922) was a Scottish footballer who played for Renton, Dumbarton and Scotland.

Having won the Scottish Cup with Dumbarton in 1883, he was the sole member of that team still with the club when they were joint champions of the inaugural Scottish Football League in 1891, becoming the first player to claim medals from both competitions; the distinction was almost shared by all his teammates, but they had lost the 1891 Scottish Cup Final three months earlier. The Sons of the Rock went on to win the title outright in 1892. Keir ceased playing regularly in 1893, but returned for one cup appearance four years later.

Honours
Dumbarton
 Scottish Football League:  1890–91, 1891–92
 Scottish Cup: 1882–83
 Runner-up 1886–87, 1890–91
 Dumbartonshire Cup: Winners 1888–89, 1889–90, 1890-91, 1891-92
 League Charity Cup: 1890–91
 Glasgow Merchants Charity Cup: Runner-up 1884–85
 Greenock Charity Cup: Winner 1889–90; Runner-up  1888–89
 4 caps for Scotland between 1886 and 1888, scoring one goal;
 9 representative caps between 1884 and 1890 (7 for Dumbartonshire, 1 for a West of Scotland XI and 1 for a Scots Anglo XI).

References

Sources

External links

London Hearts profile
Leitch Keir (The Sons Archive - Dumbarton Football Club History)

1861 births
1922 deaths
Scottish footballers
Scotland international footballers
Renton F.C. players
Dumbarton F.C. players
People from Alloa
Sportspeople from Dumbarton
Footballers from West Dunbartonshire
Association football central defenders
Association football wing halves
Sportspeople from Clackmannanshire
Scottish Football League players